is a Japan-exclusive action-adventure video game based on the popular Gon.

Notes

External links
  
Gon Manga/TV Show Inspires 3DS Action Game at Anime News Network's Encyclopedia

Gon (manga)
2012 video games
Action video games
Inti Creates games
Japan-exclusive video games
Bandai Namco games
Nintendo 3DS games
Nintendo 3DS-only games
Video games based on anime and manga
Video games developed in Japan